T. Frank Miller (1863-1939) was an American born architect based in Philadelphia, PA in the late 19th and early 20th centuries. He primarily designed churches and speculation housing in Philadelphia.

Career 
Little is known of T. Frank Miller although his was an active practice which produced a number of churches in the Gothic Revival Style, schools, and banks in Pennsylvania and specifically the Philadelphia area. He was born in Cecil County, MD, and educated in Philadelphia city schools. Miller appears in the Philadelphia city directories from 1883 to 1908, first as a draftsman (1883-1884) and then as an architect from 1885 onward. His office addresses included: 615 Walnut Street (1887-1890); 1221 Arch Street (1891-1897); 1219 Arch Street (1898); the Lippincott Building (1899-1904); 1126 Walnut Street (1905-1907); and 908 Walnut Street (1908).

At the time of his death at age 76, Miller was residing in Swarthmore, PA.

Projects 

 William Weber Johnson House, Fort Washington, PA (1880)
 Stillwagon Residence, Upper Dublin, PA (1887)
 |African Episcopal Church of St. Thomas, Philadelphia [demolished] (1889)
 Zion (German) Lutheran Church, Philadelphia (1890)
 Odd Fellows Hall, Paschalville, Philadelphia (1890) 
 Merchant's National Bank, Bangor, PA (1890) 
 West Hope Presbyterian Church, Philadelphia (1892)
 St. Michael's Lutheran Church, Germantown (1896)
 Willow Grove High School, Willow Grove, PA
 American Legion Building, Willow Grove, PA
 Church of the Good Shepherd, Kensington, Philadelphia [demolished] (1889) 
 Spruce Street Baptist Church, Philadelphia (Renovations) (1901) 
 Schaeffer-Ashmead Memorial Lutheran Church/Chapel of the Lutheran Theological Seminary of Philadelphia (1902) 
 Lutheran Church of Our Saviour, Philadelphia (1904)
 First Reformed Church, Renovo, PA (1905)
 Spade Residence, Landsdowne, PA (1905) 
 Beth Eden Lutheran Church, Philadelphia (1907) 
 Weber House, Wyncote, PA (1909)

References 

Architects from Philadelphia
19th-century American architects
1863 births
1939 deaths
People from Cecil County, Maryland